Iliza Shlesinger: War Paint is a 2013 American stand-up comedy film directed by Jay Chapman and written by and starring Iliza Shlesinger,  Shlesinger's first stand-up comedy special for Netflix. In War Paint, filmed at the Lakewood Theater in Dallas, TX, Shlesinger talks about dating, friendship, make-up, pretending to like hiking and more.

Cast
 Iliza Shlesinger

Release
It was released on September 1, 2013 on Netflix.

References

External links
 
 
 

2013 television specials
Netflix specials
Stand-up comedy concert films
Shlesinger, Iliza: War Paint
2010s English-language films